There are a number of different writing systems for the Hokkien group of languages, including romanizations, adaptations of Bopomofo, of katakana, and of Chinese characters. Some of the most popular are compared here.

See also
 Hokkien
 Hoklo people
 Hokkien culture
 Hokkien architecture
 Written Hokkien
 Hokkien media
 Taiwanese Hokkien
 Singapore Hokkien
 Penang Hokkien
 Southern Malaysia Hokkien
 Medan Hokkien
 Philippine Hokkien
 Speak Hokkien Campaign
 Holopedia

References

Orthographies by language
Languages of Taiwan
Romanization of Chinese
Southern Min
Comparisons